Ethaliella rhodomphala is a species of sea snail, a marine gastropod mollusk in the family Trochidae, the top snails.

Distribution
This marine species occurs off the Maldives,  New Caledonia and New South Wales (Australia).

The New Caledonian occurrence may actually be Trochus  (Monilea)  rhodomphalus  Souverbie, 1875. This species seems, as Fischer has suggested, close to Trochus rotelloeformis Philippi.

References

External links
 To Encyclopedia of Life
 To World Register of Marine Species
 Héros et al. (2007), Compendium of marine species of New Caledonia. Doc. Sci. Tech. IRD, Nouméa. II7(2): 199-254
  Michael Rule et al. (2007), The marine environment of northern New South Wales

rhodomphala
Gastropods described in 1903